João Moojen de Oliveira (December 1, 1904 in Leopoldina, MG, Brazil – March 31, 1985 in Rio de Janeiro, RJ, Brazil) was a zoologist dedicated to the systematics of Brazilian mammals, particularly rodents and primates. He was also interested in birds. He collected extensively between the 1930s and 50s and wrote "Os Roedores do Brasil" in 1952, a key book on Brazilian rodents. He was an authority on spiny rats of the genus Phyllomys. As well as performing research, Moojen worked significantly as a teacher and technical advisor; positions held include: head of the Biology Department of  Escola Superior de Agricultura e Veterinária do Estado de Minas Gerais, in Viçosa; Professor-Head of Natural History of Colégio Universitário da Universidade do Brasil; Naturalist of Vertebrate and Invertebrate Zoology Division of Museu Nacional including headed this division into two stages and collected most of the mammals deposited in this collection and in Universidade do Estado do Rio de Janeiro; zoologist of the Rockefeller Foundation; member of Society of the Sigma Xi for the Promotion of Research in Science, the American Society of Mammalogists, the Cooper Ornithological Club and Phi Sigma Biological Society; commissioned by the Federal Government to organize the Brasília Zoo-Botanical, and was also Director of the Department for Nature Protection of Brasília.

Genus and species of Rodents described by Moojen

Genus
 Juscelinomys Moojen, 1965 
Species and sub-species
 Trinomys paratus Moojen, 1948
 Trinomys gratiosus Moojen, 1948
 T. g. gratiosus Moojen, 1948
 T. g. bonafidei Moojen, 1948
 Phyllomys kerri Moojen, 1950 
 Juscelinomys candango Moojen, 1965 
 Kerodon acrobata Moojen, Locks & Langguth, 1997

Genus and species in honor of Moojen
 Pisces – Characidae: Moojenichthys Ribeiro, 1956
 Opilionida – Gonyleptidae: Moojenia Mello Leitão, 1935
 Diplopoda – Vanhoeffeniidae: Moojenodesmus Schubart, 1944
 Reptilia – Viperidae: Bothrops moojeni Hoge, 1965
 Scorpinida – Bothriuridae: Bothriurus moojeni Mello Leitão, 1945
 Scolopendromorpha – Scolopendridae: Scolopendra angulata moojeni Bücherl, 1941 
 Rodentia – Echimyidae: Trinomys moojeni Pessôa, Oliveira & Reis, 1992 
 Rodenia – Cricetidae: Oligoryzomys moojeni Weksler & Bonvicino, 2005

References

1904 births
1985 deaths
20th-century Brazilian zoologists